Bądzsław  is a masculine Old Polish name that is constructed from two words: bądź (be) and sław (famous). This name is very rarely used.

In Poland Bądzsław has his nameday on 12 August.